The Iowa Star Conference is a high school athletic conference in Central and Northeast Iowa. The conference comprises fifteen schools, split between north and south divisions within the conference.

Current members

North Division

Future Division Member

South Division

Recent history
North Tama County joined the Iowa Star in 2003, leaving the North Iowa Cedar League.

Former member CAL (Coulter-Alexander-Latimer) last had their own high school in the 2017–18 school year. After many years of sharing sports teams with Dows High School, and competing as CAL–Dows, Dows left the agreement and partnered with Clarion–Goldfield for the 2014–15 school year. The CAL school district still supports grades K–6, with grades 7–12 attending Hampton–Dumont; the athletic teams are referred to as Hampton-Dumont-CAL.

Members Baxter and Collins–Maxwell formerly partnered in sports, which Baxter ended that agreement to compete on their own in 2016. Both schools joined the conference separately in 2017.

BCLUW (Conrad) joined the Iowa Star Conference starting with the 2022-23 school year. BCLUW formerly competed in the North Iowa Cedar League.

On August 15, 2022, it was announced that Rockford would be joining the North Division from the Top of Iowa Conference East Division in the 2023-2024 school year.

External links
 Official site

References

High school sports in Iowa